The Victoria Cougars were a major junior ice hockey team based in Victoria, British Columbia that played in the WCHL (Western Canadian Hockey League) a precursor to the  Western Hockey League between 1971 and 1994. Prior to 1971, the Cougars were members of the Pacific Coast Junior Hockey League (1962–1967) and the British Columbia Junior Hockey League (1967–1971). The Cougars played their home games at the Victoria Memorial Arena, which was demolished in 2003.

They won the WHL championship in 1981.  The team moved to Prince George, British Columbia in 1994 and are now the Prince George Cougars. The Cougars earned several WHL records during their time in Victoria, both for most wins (60 in 1980–81) and for fewest points (12 in 1989–90).  Their five wins that season set a WHL record for futility within a 72-game season, which included a record setting 32 game losing streak (November 22, 1989 – February 11, 1990).

Season-by-season record
Note: GP = Games played, W = Wins, L = Losses, T = Ties Pts = Points, GF = Goals for, GA = Goals against

NHL alumni
There were 58 alumni of the Victoria Cougars who graduated from junior hockey to play in the National Hockey League. Source. Goaltender Grant Fuhr was inducted in the Hockey Hall of Fame.

See also
List of ice hockey teams in British Columbia

References

2005–06 WHL Guide
Victoria Cougars (all junior and pro variations) at HockeyDB

Cougars
Ice hockey clubs established in 1971
Defunct Western Hockey League teams
Defunct ice hockey teams in British Columbia
1971 establishments in British Columbia
1994 disestablishments in British Columbia
Ice hockey clubs disestablished in 1994